Dried shrimp are shrimp that have been sun-dried and shrunk to a thumbnail size. They are used in many East Asian, Southeast Asian and South Asian cuisines, imparting a unique umami taste. A handful of shrimp is generally used for dishes. The flavors of this ingredient are released when allowed to simmer.

Use

East Asia

In Chinese cuisine, dried shrimp are used quite frequently for their sweet and unique flavor that is very different from fresh shrimp. They have the coveted umami flavor (or so-called "fifth taste"). It is an ingredient in the Cantonese XO sauce. Dried shrimp are also used in Chinese (mostly Cantonese) soups and braised dishes.  It is also featured in Cantonese cuisine, particularly in some dim sum dishes such as rolled and rice noodle roll and in zongzi. Despite the literal meaning of the name Chinese name xiā mǐ ("shrimp rice"), it has nothing to do with rice other than the fact that the shrimp are shrunk to a tiny size similar to grains of rice.

Dried shrimp are also used in Korean cuisine, where they are soaked briefly to reconstitute them, and are then stir-fried with seasonings—typically garlic, ginger, scallions, soy sauce, sugar, and hot peppers—and served as a side dish. It is called "mareunsaeu bokkeum" (hangul: 마른새우볶음) in Korean. They are also used in some Korean braised dishes (jorim) and used for making broth.

Southeast Asia

Dried shrimp are used in Vietnamese cuisine, where they are called tôm khô, and are used in soups, congee, fried rice, or as a topping on stirfries (Mì Xào) or savoury snack items. They are also commonly eaten as snacks.

The Malays living in Malaysia developed sambal udang kering, which uses dried shrimp. Dried shrimp is a staple ingredient in the cuisine of Malaysia, with it being a base to rempah, a spice paste that forms the body of many Malay curries.

In Indonesia dried shrimp is called ebi, the name was derived from either Chinese Hokkian dialects "hebi" means "shrimp rice" or Japanese word "ebi" means "shrimp" (either fresh or dried). Ebi is important part of Indonesian cuisine as well as Palembang cuisine, it is used in various Indonesian stir fried vegetable dishes, such as stir fried white cabbages with ebi. In Palembang, ebi is boiled, ground and sautéed, to make savoury shrimp powder sprinkled upon pempek fried fish cake. Ebi also important ingredient to make shrimp broth and cooked in coconut milk to make Mie Celor. The ebi powder often also sprinkled upon asinan or sometimes rujak.

In Burmese cuisine, dried shrimp is called bazun-chauk and is used widely in cooking, such as salads, soups and condiments. It is primarily used along the coast and coastal ethnic minorities' cuisines. Toasted whole dry shrimps are used in a wide variety of Burmese salads such as laphet (fermented tea leaves), tomato and kaffir lime salads. Shredded dried prawns are used to prepare condiments such as ngapi kyaw and balachaung kyaw. Dried shrimp is also used as stock for Burmese thin soups.

Known as kung haeng in Thai cuisine, dried shrimp is used extensively with chilies and Thai herbs to produce various types of chili paste and Thai curry paste. Dried shrimp is also used in salads such as in the Northeastern Thai som tam (green papaya salad).

In the Philippines, dried shrimp is called "hibi/hibe" and is used like salt to season dishes as well as in soup bases such as misua.

South Asia 
In India, it is used in the cuisines of Odisha, Konkan, Andhra, Tamil Nadu and Northeast region of India. There are several varieties for e.g.:- in Tamil Nadu it is called as chenna kunni: In Andhra, It is called endu royya. Nagayalanka in Diviseema is famous for endu royya pappu in Andhra. 
 javla: made from a tiny species of shrimp called karandi, which is typically dried head and shell on and consumed whole, 
 sukat:, made from a larger species of shrimp which is typically dried with the head and shell on and consumed after the head and legs are trimmed
 soda: a larger variety which is dried after it is shelled.
It is hydrated and shelled and added to dosakai (type of cucumber) and egg plant dishes. It is also used to flavor rasam Or coconut curry in konkan.

In Sri Lanka, dried shrimp is the main component of koonisso mallum also known as pol mallum, a popular dish in the country.

Africa
It is used in many African countries, like Nigeria, when preparing many dishes involving vegetables, typically cooked in oil with vegetables like spinach, pepper and tomato sauce.

Mexico
Dried shrimp is commonly found in markets all throughout Mexico and perhaps their best-known use is in the "meatballs" that accompany the traditional Christmas dish romeritos. Dried shrimp is also used for dried shrimp patties that is cooked in a red sauce with cactus (nopales). This dish is common around Lent and Christmas time.

Brazil
The cuisine of Brazil's northeastern region makes extensive use of dried shrimp, which they call "camarão seco". It is often reconstituted for use in stews or special hot sauces, such as in Acarajé. It may also be ground into a fine powder for use as a condiment, as on Moqueca. At times it is added directly to a dish as an edible garnish.

United States
Dried shrimp was introduced to the American South in the 18th-century colonial period, by thriving Filipino fishers in Saint Malo, which was located in present-day St. Bernard Parish, Louisiana, on the shore of Lake Borgne, until 1915.

In south Louisiana, dried shrimp are often added by Cajun cooks to gumbo, to add an intense salty flavor. They can also be eaten as a snack by themselves, and can be commonly found in snack-size portions in south Louisiana's stores.

See also

Budu
Conpoy
Fish sauce
List of dried foods
Padaek
Saeujeot
Shrimp paste

References

Dried meat
Edible crustaceans
Fish processing
Umami enhancers